The 2010 Challenge Cup (also known as the Carnegie Challenge Cup for sponsorship reasons) was the 109th staging of the most competitive European rugby league tournament at club level and was open to teams from England, Wales, Scotland, France and Russia. It began its preliminary stages on 2 January 2010.

Warrington Wolves successfully defended their title after beating Leeds Rhinos 30 - 6 in the final.

Preliminary round

The draw for the preliminary round was divided into two pools, separating amateur teams from university, police, Armed Services and regional champion teams. Lee Briers and Michael Monaghan, who both played for the Warrington Wolves team which won the 2009 Challenge Cup Final, made the draw at Leeds Metropolitan University.

Pool A

An additional twenty-six teams were granted byes into the first round as a result of the draw.

Pool B

An additional ten teams were granted byes into the first round as a result of the draw.

Round 1

The draw for Round 1 was made immediately after the draw for the preliminary round. Ties were played on 23 & 24 January 2010.

Pool A

Pool B

Round 2

The draw for Round 2 was made on 26 January 2010. Ties were played on 13 & 14 February 2010.

Pool A

Pool B

Round 3

The draw for Round 3 was made on 16 February. Ties were played on 6–8 March.

Round 4

The draw for Round 4 was made on 8 March. Ties were played on 16–18 April.

Round 5

The draw for Round 5 was made on 18 April. Ties were played on 07 - 9 May. The game between Halifax and Batley Bulldogs was postponed due to Halifax being suspected of fielding an ineligible player - Michael Ostick -  who played for Rochdale Hornets in the third round. Despite being cup-tied, the Rugby Football League found that he played for Halifax in round four against Swinton Lions. The Lions were reinstated and Halifax removed from the competition, with their head coach Matt Calland being suspended by the club.

Quarter-finals

The draw for the Quarter-finals was made on 9 May. Ties were played on 28–30 May.

Semi-finals

The draw for the Semi-finals was made on 2 June 2010. Ties were played on 7 and 8 August 2010.

Final 

On 20 August 2010, the Rugby Football League announced that it had sold its allocation of 72,000 tickets for the match which is set to be one of the most anticipated cup finals of recent years.

The final was played at Wembley Stadium on 28 August.

Chris Hicks of Warrington Wolves scored the first hat-trick in a Challenge Cup Final in the new Wembley stadium as the Wolves ran away 30-6 winners. It was 14–0 to the Wolves at half-time

Teams:

Warrington: Richard Mathers, Chris Hicks, Matt King, Ryan Atkins, Chris Riley, Lee Briers, Michael Monaghan, Adrian Morley (c), Jon Clarke, Garreth Carvell, Louis Anderson, Ben Westwood, Ben Harrison
Replacements: Paul Wood, David Solomona, Mickey Higham, Vinnie Anderson Coach: Tony Smith
Tries: Hicks (3), Atkins (2), Anderson. Goals: Westwood (3).

Leeds: Brent Webb, Lee Smith, Brett Delaney, Keith Senior, Ryan Hall,  Danny McGuire, Rob Burrow, Kylie Leuluai, Danny Buderus, Chris Clarkson, Jamie Jones-Buchanan,  Ryan Bailey, Kevin Sinfield (c),
Replacements: Ian Kirke, Matt Diskin, Greg Eastwood, Carl Ablett Coach: Brian McClennan
Tries: Smith Goals: Sinfield.

UK Broadcasting rights
Selected matches were televised solely by the BBC.

1 Coverage in Northern Ireland, Scotland and Wales started half an hour later.

2 Coverage in Northern Ireland started forty five minutes later.

External links
 Challenge Cup on the Rugby Football League's website

References

2010
2010 in English rugby league
2010 in British sport
2010 in French rugby league
2010 in Welsh rugby league
2010 in Scottish sport
2010 in Russian sport